Tercera Federación, previously known as Tercera División RFEF, is the fifth tier of the Spanish football league system. It is below the Primera División (also known as La Liga), the Segunda División, and the semi-professional divisions Primera Federación and Segunda Federación. It was founded in 1929 as the third tier, and dropped down to the fourth and fifth tiers in 1977 and 2021, respectively.

History
On 6 May 2020, the RFEF announced the creation of a new, two-group, 40-team third division called Primera División RFEF, which made the former third and fourth divisions, Segunda División B and Tercera División, respectively, to drop down a level and change into Segunda División RFEF and Tercera División RFEF; the changes were made effective for the 2021–22 campaign.

In July 2022, the division was renamed into Tercera Federación.

Current format
The Tercera Federación features 18 regional groups (like the former fourth tier Tercera División), corresponding to the autonomous communities of Spain (due to its size, Andalusia is divided into two groups, East and West; Ceuta is allocated to West Andalusia, while Melilla is allocated to the East), where each group is administered by a regional football federation. At the end of the season the first four teams in each group qualify for promotion play-offs to decide which teams are promoted to Segunda Federación. At least the three teams finishing bottom of each group may be relegated to the Divisiones Regionales de Fútbol. However the number of teams relegated can vary. The eighteen group champions also qualify for the following season's Copa del Rey. However reserve teams are ineligible. Along with teams from Segunda Federación, the remaining teams from the division compete in the Copa Federación.

Teams
The member clubs of the Tercera Federación for the 2022–23 season are listed below.

Winners and promotions
All group champions are promoted to Segunda Federación. Administrative promotions not included in this table.

References

External links
 Official RFEF Site
 Group for Spanish Football Statistics Compilation 
 Map of Regions used in 2000-01
 

 
2021 establishments in Spain
5
Spa
Sports leagues established in 2021